The Chrysalis is a 2013 Chinese horror film directed by Qiu Chuji.

Cast
 Sandrine Pinna as Guan Wenxin
 Ren Quan as Luo Jia
 Lee Wei as Wu Guangming
 Cui Jie as Dr. Dai
 Wendy Gao as Wendy, Annie's elder sister
 Christa Yan as Dai Anni/Anne
 Zhan Chuheng as Chunshan
 Sun Jun as Hui
 Liu Shengyue as Sheng
 Xiao Xi as Sheng's mother
 Zhuang Wenyan as fourth aunt
 Li Wenlong as Mao
 Wu Jing as a real estate agent

Release
A novel of the film was written by director Qiu Chuji and writer Menga Lee was published in December 2012. The film was released in China on February 1, 2013.

Reception
Film Business Asia gave the film a six out of ten rating, referring to the film as "Intriguing but unfocused psycho-horror ranges from great to corny but remains watchable".

References

External links
 

Chinese horror films
2013 horror films
2013 films